Renovating Diverse City (stylized Renovating→Diverse City) is the fourth album released by Christian recording artist tobyMac.  All the tracks are remixes of songs from tobyMac's previous CD, Welcome to Diverse City, with the exception of two original songs. Some remixes include new or revised pieces of the  original song (ILL-M-I's original chorus doesn't appear until the final chorus, for instance). Several other Christian artists make appearances on this CD, including DJ Maj, Paul Wright, Tricia Brock of Superchick, and Toby's son Truett as "truDog". The Catchafire remix was once in the Top 5 songs on Christian-HipHop.net and, since it became as popular as it did, is often mistaken for the original mix of Catchafire.

Track listing

Charts

References

TobyMac albums
2005 remix albums
ForeFront Records remix albums